Buranovo is a rural locality (a selo) in Antipinsky Selsoviet, Togulsky District, Altai Krai, Russia. The population was 188 as of 2013. There are 4 streets.

Geography 
Titovo is the nearest rural locality.

References 

Rural localities in Togulsky District